The Peter Pan Prize (Swedish: Peter Pan-Prisets) was established in 2000 by IBBY Sweden and the Göteborg Book Fair. It is awarded annually "to a book for children or young adults of high quality in both literary and subject terms, satisfying one or more of the following criteria: (1) by an author previously unpublished or little known in Sweden; (2) from a country, language group or culture with limited representation in Sweden; (3) with content concerning children or young adults in less familiar countries and cultures less familiar to Swedish readers" Runner-up prizes are called Silver Stars (Swedish: Silverstjärna).

Peter Pan Prize Winners 
2019 Doften av ett hem (The Scent of a Home) - by Bonnie Sue Hitchcock
2018 Akissi och det flygande fåret (Akisssi and Flying Sheep) - by Marguerite Abouet and Mathieu Sapin
2017 Mitt år av längtan (My Year of Longing) - by Dasha Tolstikova 
2016 Sabelles röda klänning (Sabelle's Red Dress) - by Marina Michaelidou-Kadi, illus. Daniela Stamatiadi 
2015 Guji Guji (Guji Guji) - by Chih-Yuan Chen
2014 Världens ände (Everybody Jam) - by Ali Lewis, translated by Elisabeth Fredholm (Förlaget Opal)
2013 Naku, Nakuu, Nakuuu! - by Nanoy Rafael, illus. Sergio Bumatay III, translated by Anna Gustafsson Chen
2012 Ensam hemma (While We Were Out) - by Lee
2011 Ankomsten (The Arrival) - by Shaun Tan for translated from English (Kabusa Böcker)
2010 Makwelane och krokodilen (Makwelane and the Crocodile) - by Maria Hendricks, illus. Piet Grobler, translated by Ulla Forsén 
2009 Den absolut sanna historien om mitt liv som halvtidsindian (The Absolutely True Diary of a Part-Time Indian) - by Sherman Alexie, translated by Ingela Jernberg 
2008 Blunda och öppna ditt fönster (Vừa Nhắm Mắt Vừa Mở Cửa Sổ) [Open the Window with Closed Eyes] - by Nguyen Ngoc Thuan, translated by Hoai Anh Tran
2007 Kiffe Kiffe imorgon (Kiffe Kiffe demain) - by Faïza Guène, translated by Lotta Riad 
2006 Long-longs nyår: en berättelse om den kinesiska vårfesten (Long-Long's New Year) - by Catherine Gower, illust. He Zhihong, translated by Lotta Riad 
2005 Persepolis - by Marjane Satrapi, translated by Gabriella Theiler
2004 Över näktergalens golv (Across the Nightingale Floor) - by Lian Hearn, translated by Carla Wiberg 
2003 Den osynliga flickan (The Breadwinner) - by Deborah Ellis, translated by Helena Ridelberg
2002 Alexis Kouros for På en ö i havet (On an Island in the Sea), translated by Janina Orlov (Alfabeta Bokförlag)
2001 Hipp, hurra för mormor (Hip, Hip, Hurray for Grandma) - by Cari Best, illus. Giselle Potter, translated by Barbro Lagergren
2000 Katies krig (Katie's War) - by Aubrey Flegg, translated by Gunilla Borén

Shortlist 2020 

 Molnbullar – by Baek Heena (South Korea), translated by Johee Kim and Jonas Thelander
 Josefs vagga – by Jude Daly (South Africa), translated by Ulla Forsén
 Planeten Frank – by David Yoon (USA), translated by Carina Jansson
 Dubbel trubbel för Anna Hibiscus! – by Atinuke (Nigeria), illus. Lauren Tobia (UK), translated by Matilda Wallin
 Min pappa och jag – by Nari Hong (South Korea), translated by Anna Lärk Ståhlberg
 När månen glömde – by Jimmy Liao (Taiwan), translated by Anna Gustafsson Chen
 Ett hastigt rent rop – by Siobhan Dowd (Ireland), translated by Helena Ridelberg
 Landet Bomb; Landet Gräs – by Brane Mozetic, illus. Maja Kastelic (Slovenia), translated by Dolores Meden
 Bené – snabbare än den snabbaste hönan – by Eymard Toledo (Brazil), translated by Björn Eklund
 Fåglarnas here – by Rogério Andrade Barbosa, illus. Salmo Dansa (Brazil), translated by Birgitta Alm

Awards 2019 

 Peter Pan Prize: Doften av ett hem - by Bonnie-Sue Hitchcock (USA), translated by Helena Hansson
 Silver Star: Paveen och buffertjejen [The Pave and the Buffer Girl] - by Siobhan Dowd, illus. Emma Shoard, translated by Helena Ridelberg
 Silver Star: Är du min bror? [Are you My Brother?] - by Liu Hsu-kung, translated by Anna Gustafsson Chen

Awards 2018 

 Peter Pan Prize: Akissi och det flygande fåret [Akisssi and Flying Sheep] - by Marguerite Abouet and Mathieu Sapin
 Silver Star: The Great Story of a Small Line - by Serge Bloch (France), translated by Christo Burman
 Silver Star: Mouth of the Night - by Cristino Wapichana (Brazil), illus. Graça Lima, translated by Helena Vermcrantz

Awards 2017 

 Peter Pan Prize: Mittår av längtan - by Dasha Tolstikova, translated by Karin Berg
 Silver star: Stopp! Ingen får passera! [Stop! No one is Allowed to Pass] - by Isabel Minhó Martins (Portugal), illus. Bernardo P. Carvalho, translated by Erik Titusson
 Silver star: Kanske ett äpple [Maybe an Apple] - by Shinsuke Yoshitake, translated by Yukiko Duke

Awards 2016 

 Peter Pan Prize: Sabelles röda klänning [Sabelle's Red Dress] - by Marina Michaelidou-Kadi, illus. Daniela Stamatiadi
 Silver Star: Strong as a bear - by Katrin Stangl, translated from German
 Silver Star: Princess who did not like princes - by Alice Brière-Haquet and Lionel Larcheveqque, translated from French

Awards 2015 

 Peter Pan Prize: Guji Guji [Guji Guji] - by Chih-Yuan Chen
 Silver Star: Malala - the words are her weapon - by Karen Legget Abouraya and L.C. Wheatley, translated by Ulla Forsén
 Silver Star: Wow what a party! -  by Ana Maria Machado (Brazil) and Hélène Moreau, translated by Helena Vermcrantz

Awards 2013 

 Peter Pan Prize: Naku, Nakuu, Nakuuu! - by Nanoy Rafael, illus. Sergio Bumatay III, translated by Anna Gustafsson Chen
 Silver Star: If there was a war in the Nordic countries - by Janne Teller, translated by Karin Nyman
 Silver Star: Djangon - by Lilla Piratförlaget and Levi Pinfold, translated by Emelie Andr

Awards 2012 

 Peter Pan Prize: Ensam hemma (While We Were Out) - by Lee
 Silver Star: Streaks of Hope - by Box Sepetys, translated by Linda Erkelius
 Silver Star: Earth Children, children of heaven - by Choi Sukhee, translated by Ahryun Gustafsson

Awards 2011 

 Peter Pan Prize: Ankomsten - by Shaun Tan,  translated from English (The Arrival)
 Silver Star: Enchanted Fruit - by John Kilaka, translated by Britt Isaksson
 Silver Star: Peace Drums - by Meshack Asare, translated by Peter Törnqvist

Awards 2010 

 Peter Pan Prize: Makwelane och krokodilen (Makwelane and the Crocodile), by Maria Hendricks, illus. Piet Grobler, translated by Ulla Forsén
 Silver Star: Ghost Train - by Rintaro Uchida, illus. Shiego Nishimura, translated by Asuka Ukai
 Silver Star: Ruby Red - by Linzi Ice Cream, translated by Helena Ridelberg

Awards 2009 

 Peter Pan Prize: Den absolut sanna historien om mitt liv som halvtidsindian - by Sherman Alexie, translated by Ingela Jernberg
 Silver Star: Whimsical Mama Sambona - by Hermann Schulz, illus. Tobias Krejtschi, translated by Ulla Forsén
 Silver Star: Honey Flower - by Alice Veiria, translated by Helena and Per Erik Vermcrantz

Awards 2008 

 Peter Pan Prize: Blunda och öppna ditt fönster - by 2008 Nguyen Ngoc Thuan, translated from Vietnamese (Vừa Nhắm Mắt Vừa Mở Cửa Sổ) [Open the Window with Closed Eyes] by Hoai Anh Tran 
 Silver Star: Otroso - latest news from the underworld - by Graciela Montes, translated by Ann Karin Thorburn
 Silver Star: Purple and the Secret of the Rain - by David Convay and Jude Daly, translated by Ulla Forsén

Awards 2007 

 Peter Pan Prize: Kiffe Kiffe imorgon - by Faïza Guène, translated by Lotta Riad
 Silver Star: Ängeln in the stairwell - by Kristin Steinsdóttir, illus. Halla Sólveig þorgeirdóttir, translated by John Swedenmark
 Silver Star: Pikkuhenki - the story of a very small witch - by Toon Tellegen, illus. Marit Törnqvist, translated by Signe Zeilich

Awards 2006 

 Peter Pan Prize: Long-longs nyår: en berättelse om den kinesiska vårfesten - by Catherine Gower, illus. He Zhihong, translated by Lotta Riad (Förlaget Hjulet)
 Silver Star: With me, everything is okay - by Guus Kuijer , translated by Boerje Bohlin
 Silver Star: Death in a Nutshell - by Eric Maddern, illus. Paul Hess, translated by Ulla Forsén

Awards 2005 

 Peter Pan Prize: Persepolis - by Marjane Satrapi, translated by Gabriella Theiler
 Silver Star: Pomelo are in love - by Ramona Badescu, illus. Benjamin Chaud, translated by Barbro Lindgren
 Silver Star: Rani & Sukh - by Bali Rai, translated by Katarina Jansson

Awards 2004 

 Peter Pan Prize: Över näktergalens golv - by Lian Hearn, translated by Carla Wiberg 
 Silver Star: Fresh Fish - by John Kilaka, translated by Britt Isaksson
 Silver Star: Stravaganza. The city of masks - by Mary Hoffman, translated by  Lena Karlin
 Silver Star: The Dream of Palestine - by Randa Ghazy, translated by Olov Hyllienmark

Awards 2003 

 Peter Pan Prize: Den osynliga flickan - by Deborah Ellis, translated by Helena Ridelberg     
 Silver Star: (O) planned wedding - by Bali Rai, translated by Olov H,yllienmark
 Silver Star: The Lord of Thieves - by Cornelia Funke, translated by Gunilla Borén
 Silver Star: Grandpa's angel - by Jutta Bauer, translated by Monica Stein

Awards 2002 

 Peter Pan Prize: På en ö i havet - by Alexis Kouros, translated by Janina Orlov 
 Silver Star: Bat Summer - by Sarah Withrow, translated by Ann-Marie Ljungberg

Awards 2001 

 Peter Pan Prize: Hipp, hurra för mormor - by Cari Best, illus. Giselle Potter (illustrator), translated by Barbro Lagergren
 Silver Star: Emma and the chalk princess - by Brigitte Minne, illus. Anne Westerduin, translated by Mary S Lund
 Silver Star: Fox and hare - by Sylvia Vanden Heede, illus. Thé Tjong-Khing, translated by Paul Wouters
 Silver Star: Ön in Fågelgatan - by Uri Orlev, translated by Carla Wiberg

Awards 2000 

 Peter Pan Prize: Katies krig - by Aubrey Flegg, translated by Gunilla Borén 
 Silver Star: Kwela Jamela. Queen of Africa - by Niki Daly, translated by Britt Isaksson
 Silver Star: A week full of Saturdays - by Paul Maar, translated by Gunilla Borén
 Silver Star: One Hole a Day - by Louis Sachar, translated by Peter Lindforss

External links 

 The Peter Pan Prize and the Silver Stars (IBBY Sweden website)

References 

Swedish literary awards
Children's literary awards
Swedish children's literature
Translation awards